Chrysoesthia isocharis is a moth of the family Gelechiidae. It is found in South Africa.

The larvae feed on Achyranthes aspera.

References

Endemic moths of South Africa
Moths described in 1963
Chrysoesthia